Gaspar Alfonso Pérez de Guzmán y Sandoval, 9th Duke of Medina Sidonia (1602–1664) was a Spanish nobleman who became Duke of Medina Sidonia in 1636, upon the death of Juan Manuel Pérez de Guzmán, 8th Duke of Medina Sidonia.

In 1622, aged 20, he married his 14-year-old aunt Ana María de Guzmán (1607–1637), having four children by her, of which only the youngest, Gaspar Juan, survived to inherit the title.
In 1639, the 9th Duke was married for a second time to Seville noblewoman Juana Fernández de Córdoba, but only after signing documents giving the considerable amount of 20,000 Ducados to Margarita Marañon, on condition she become a nun near his palace in Sanlúcar de Barrameda, later in a Dominican convent. It is said she was the mother of his illegitimate daughter, Luisa.

In 1640, his sister Luisa of Guzman became the new Queen of Portugal, as the wife of the former Duke of Braganza, now John IV of Portugal. In 1641 the 9th Duke led the Andalusian rebellion against Spanish rule. Though both Portugal and Catalonia had strong cultural identities, an historical record of independence, and popular support, Andalusia did not, and the rebellion failed. The duke had the support of his brother-in-law, John IV of Portugal, but the promised naval aid from France and the Netherlands did not arrive. The king of Spain forgave his treason, but the previous prestige of his house was only regained by his successor.

1602 births
1664 deaths
Dukes of Medina Sidonia